James Richard Weinman (1854 – 19 October 1934) was a Ceylonese (Sri Lankan) lawyer, judge and legislator. He was a member of the Legislative Council of Ceylon and had served as District Judge of Colombo.

Weinman was born in 1854 in Peradeniya, the eldest son of John George Weinman and Julia Elizabeth née de Wolf. He was educated at the Colombo Academy and read law under Charles Ferdinands (the first Solicitor General of Ceylon) and James de Alwis. He served as an Advocate, before taking positions as Commissioner of Court of Requests, Police Magistrate, additional District Judge and then District Judge of Colombo.

Bibliography

References

Members of the Legislative Council of Ceylon
District Courts of Sri Lanka judges
Alumni of Royal College, Colombo
1934 deaths
People from British Ceylon
1854 births